truTV's Top Funniest (named Top 20 Funniest for its first season) is an American fast-paced caught-on-tape/hidden camera clip show on truTV, which shows numerous comical clips, most often involving people being injured, similar to that of the deaths in 1000 Ways To Die. It aired weekly on Tuesday's at 9:30pm. It premiered on May 23, 2013. 60 episodes have been aired. Mocean Melvin was the show's narrator for the first two seasons. He was then replaced by Charlie Schlatter for the show's third and final season.

In its inaugural season, each episode had a different theme such as "Fantastic Failures", "What Was I Thinking?", etc. Over 100 videos were showcased per episode. 20 of those videos were on the main countdown, and normally came at the end of a string of videos based on the central theme that night.

For the second season, the countdown was dropped and the videos in each episode were grouped into different categories, which was seen in a sidebar on the right hand of the screen. The sidebar was discontinued for season 3 while keeping the same clip format from the previous season.

On March 12, 2015, truTV renewed the show for a third season. The third season consisted of 22 half-hour episodes and premiered on May 5, 2015. There has been no talk of any more episodes.

Episodes

Season 1 (2013)

Season 2 (2014)

Season 3 (2015)

References

External links 
truTV's "Top 20 Funniest" site with video clips

American hidden camera television series
2010s American video clip television series
TruTV original programming
2010s American reality television series
2013 American television series debuts
2015 American television series endings
English-language television shows